Archicollinella is a genus of flies belonging to the family Lesser Dung flies.

Species
A. caerulea (Duda, 1925)
A. dolichoptera (Richards, 1963)
A. penteseta (Richards, 1929)

References

Sphaeroceridae
Muscomorph flies of Europe
Diptera of Africa
Diptera of South America
Taxa named by Oswald Duda
Sphaeroceroidea genera